The Winnemucca Main Post Office, which is listed on the National Register of Historic Places as US Post Office—Winnemucca Main, is located at 4th and Melarkey Sts. in Winnemucca, Nevada and was built in 1921;  it includes Classical Revival architecture and was listed on the National Register of Historic Places in 1990.

Although built from standardized plans, it was deemed significant as "a good example of a small town single-purpose post office", and it is in fact the oldest Federal building in Nevada (a Federal building in Reno was built earlier, but was replaced).  The building was extended and remodeled in 1940, and then gained a mural, one of three New Deal arts program murals in post offices in the state.

The building is currently used as the Winnemucca City Hall.

References

Buildings and structures in Humboldt County, Nevada
Post office
Post office buildings on the National Register of Historic Places in Nevada
National Register of Historic Places in Humboldt County, Nevada
Government buildings completed in 1921
Neoclassical architecture in Nevada